The Cambist and Lord Iron: A Fairy Tale of Economics is a 2007 novelette by Daniel Abraham. It was originally published in the anthology Logorrhea: Good Words Make Good Stories, and subsequently republished in The Year's Best Fantasy and Horror 2008: 21st Annual Collection (2008), in Fantasy: The Best of the Year (2008), in The Best Science Fiction and Fantasy of the Year Volume Two (2008), and in Lightspeed (2013); as well, an audio version was made available via PodCastle in 2009.

Synopsis
Olaf Neddelsohn is a cambist who leads a quiet life until he comes to the attention of Lord Iron, a brutal and decadent aristocrat who sets him impossible challenges.

Reception
Cambist was nominated for the 2008 Hugo Award for Best Novelette and the 2008 World Fantasy Award for Best Short Story.

Black Gate called it "amazing" and "a fable of economics", and the SF Site described it as "splendid" and "delightful", while Strange Horizons considered it "brilliantly intellectual", but stated that it "could be straight historical fiction for all the use it makes of its vaguely fantastic setting." Steven Levitt noted that, despite agreeing with Olaf's response to Lord Iron's first challenge, he was unable to apply standard economic reasoning to the second and third challenges.

References

External links
Audio version at PodCastle
Text version at Lightspeed

2007 short stories
Economics in fiction